Farrington Ridge is an isolated linear ridge,  long, with continuous rock exposure along the crest, located  north-northwest of the Forbidden Rocks in the Jones Mountains of Antarctica. It was mapped by the University of Minnesota – Jones Mountains Party, 1960–61, who named it for Lieutenant Robert L. Farrington, U.S. Navy, co-pilot of the LC-47 Dakota aircraft that made the first landing in the Jones Mountains, 9 December 1960.

References 

Ridges of Ellsworth Land